Kismat Ki Lakiro Se is an Indian Hindi-language drama television series premiered on 5 September 2022 on Shemaroo Umang Produced by Rashmi Sharma under the banner of Rashmi Sharma Telefilms, it stars Shaily Priya Pandey, Varun Sharma, Abhishek Pathania, and Sumati Singh.

Plot

Cast
 Shaily Priya Pandey
 Varun Sharma
 Abhishek Pathania
 Sumati Singh
 Farooq Saeed
 Khushi Rajpoot
 Arup Pal
 Eva Shirali
 Ashish Kaul
 Tanu Vidhyarthi
 Dolly Kaushik
 Nadiya Himani
 Sheetal Jaiswal

Development
The series was announcement by Rashmi Sharma Telefilms for Shemaroo Umang. Principal photography commenced in Mumbai, with Shaily Priya Pandey, Varun Sharma, Abhishek Pathania and Sumati Singh as leads. The promos were released in August 2022. It premeried on 5 September 2022 on Shemaroo Umang.

Soundtrack

The title track is composed by Veer Pandya.

References

External links
 
 
 Kismat Ki Lakiro Se on ShemarooMe

2022 Indian television series debuts
Indian drama television series
Hindi-language television shows